The Minister of Arts and Culture is a Minister of the Cabinet of South Africa who is responsible for overseeing the Department of Arts and Culture. The portfolio was created on 29 April 2004 on the appointment of the second Cabinet of President Thabo Mbeki, when the Arts, Culture, Science and Technology portfolio was divided into two.   the incumbent minister is Nathi Mthethwa and his deputy is Maggie Sotyu.

Institutions

Apart from the Department of Arts and Culture, the following institutions also report to the minister:
 Afrikaanse Taalmuseum
 Artscape
 Freedom Park
 Iziko Museums of Cape Town
 Luthuli Museum
 Market Theatre
 Natal Museum
 National Arts Council
 National English Literary Museum
 National Film and Video Foundation
 National Heritage Council
 National Library of South Africa
 National Museum
 Northern Flagship Institutions
 Nelson Mandela Museum
 Performing Arts Council of the Free State
 Playhouse Company
 Robben Island Museum
 South African Geographical Names Council
 South African Heritage Resources Agency
 South African Library for the Blind
 State Theatre (South Africa)
 Windybrow Centre for the Arts
 Voortrekker/Ncome Museum
 War Museum of the Boer Republics
 William Humphreys Art Gallery

List of Past Ministers

Minister of Education, Arts and Science, 1949–1989

Minister of Education and Culture, 1989–1994

Minister of Arts, Culture, Science and Technology, 1994–2004

Minister of Arts and Culture, 2004–present

References

External links
Ministry of Arts and Culture
Department of Arts and Culture

Arts and Culture
 
South Africa
Lists of political office-holders in South Africa